is a passenger railway station located in Kawasaki-ku, Kawasaki, Kanagawa Prefecture, Japan, operated by East Japan Railway Company (JR East).

Lines

Station layout

Shōwa Station has a single side platform serving bi-directional traffic. The station is unattended.

Platform

History

Shōwa Station was opened on 20 March 1931 as a temporary stop on the privately held . Tsurumi Rinkō Railway was nationalized into the Japanese Government Railways on 1 July 1943. at which time the stop was upgraded to a full station.  The station has been unattended since 1 March 1971. Upon the privatization of the Japanese National Railways on 1 April 1987 the station has been operated by JR East. The station was named Shōwa because it was adjacent to a factory of Shōwa Fertilizer Company (present-day Showa Denko). The Showa Denko factory still exists next to the station.

Passenger statistics
In fiscal 2019, the station was used by an average of 569 passengers daily (boarding passengers only).

Surrounding area
 Showa Denko Kawasaki Office
 Toa Oil Keihin Refinery Ogimachi Factory
 JFE Steel East Japan Works Keihin District

See also
 List of railway stations in Japan

References

External links

 Shōwa Station 

Railway stations in Kanagawa Prefecture
Railway stations in Japan opened in 1931
Railway stations in Kawasaki, Kanagawa